The Memorial Tunnel is a  two-lane vehicular tunnel that formerly carried the West Virginia Turnpike through/under Paint Creek Mountain in Standard, West Virginia in Kanawha County.  Closed to interstate traffic since 1987, the tunnel serves as the Center for National Response for military first responders to train for various situations that may arise in such a location without alarming the general public.

History
Construction of the Memorial Tunnel commenced in 1952, and it officially opened to West Virginia Turnpike traffic on November 8, 1954, at a final cost of $5 million. At the time, the West Virginia Turnpike was referred to as "88 miles of miracle."

Turnpike upgrades
The turnpike became heavily used, and by 1976, upgrades to the Turnpike from two-lanes to four-lanes had commenced; by 1983 all but the Memorial Tunnel had been completed. The remaining tunnel created a bottleneck–the 4-lane, divided highway turnpike had to merge into the two-lane, two-way traffic configuration of the tunnel, which also had a lower speed limit.  This resulted in traffic backups during periods of increased traffic, such as holiday travel seasons.

Bypassed
Instead of upgrading and expanding the tunnel, a  bypass was constructed going around both the tunnel and the Bender Bridge over Paint Creek. Costing $35 million to complete,  of earth were removed in addition to 300,000 tons of coal being removed from the mountain. The last vehicle would pass through the tunnel on July 7, 1987, and it would subsequently close to vehicular through traffic.

Alternate use
Between 1992 and 1995, the Department of Transportation entered a deal with the state to utilize the abandoned tunnel for smoke, fire and ventilation experiments. These experiments were carried out to design better developed ventilation systems for the tunnels being constructed as part of the Big Dig in Boston; the results of the tests were also incorporated into the design of the Channel Tunnel. These experiments also resulted in the Federal Highway Administration allowing jet fans for ventilation in tunnel construction, which was a significant change to their original ventilation designs. The lasting legacy of the Memorial Tunnel Fire Test Program is in both changes in ceilings materials used in tunnel construction as well in the approved use of jet fans for ventilation during construction.

By 2000, the tunnel had been selected as the location where the Center for National Response would conduct anti-terrorism training exercises. The facilities offered in the center included:
 A rubble area to simulate collapsed buildings
 An emergency egress trainer
 A drug enforcement section
 A highway tunnel section, complete with a New York City Transit Authority bus, firetrucks, a tractor-trailer and other vehicles
 A 50-car pileup wreck complete with hazardous materials

Groups from around the country sent personnel to West Virginia to train in the facility. In all, about 160,000 first responders have been trained by West Virginians.

After 20 years of operating as the Center for National Response, the West Virginia National Guard announced in February, 2022 that the tunnel would be converted to a mushroom farm operated by Hernshaw Farms.

See also
 West Virginia Turnpike
 Interstate 64 in West Virginia
 Interstate 77 in West Virginia
 Abandoned Pennsylvania Turnpike
 Laurel Hill Tunnel
 Rays Hill Tunnel
 Sideling Hill Tunnel

References

External links
Center for National Response official website

Road tunnels in West Virginia
Interstate 64
Interstate 77
Buildings and structures in Kanawha County, West Virginia
Transportation in Kanawha County, West Virginia
Tunnels completed in 1954
Former toll tunnels in the United States
Former toll roads in West Virginia